The Abitibi River is a river in northeastern Ontario, Canada, which flows northwest from Lake Abitibi to join the Moose River which empties into James Bay. It is the fifth longest river entirely in Ontario

Abitibi is an Algonquin word meaning "halfway water", derived from abitah, which may be translated as "middle" or "halfway", and nipi, "water".  Originally used by the French to designate a band of Algonquin Indians who lived near the lake, the name was descriptive of their location halfway between the trading posts on the Hudson Bay and those on the Ottawa River.

The river was an important fur trading route for the Hudson's Bay Company. Formerly, pulp and paper, centered on the town of Iroquois Falls, was an important industry in the heavily forested region through which it flows. The region also supports tourism and gold mining.

The Abitibi Canyon Generating Station is located on the river at Abitibi Canyon. The experience of surveying the river for the purposes of building this plant was the inspiration for folk singer Wade Hemsworth's "The Black Fly Song".

Geography

Description of river course (in downstream order):
 Begins as outlet from Lake Abitibi
 Extreme southern point
 Ansonville, Ontario
 Iroquois Falls, Ontario
 Crossed by Ontario Northland Railway
 Long Sault Rapids hydroelectric plant
 Confluence with the Black River
 Confluence with the Frederick House River
 Ontario Northland Railway crossing at Island Falls Station, Ontario
 Island Falls, Ontario
 Abitibi Canyon Generating Station near Fraserdale, Ontario
 Otter Rapids Generating Station
 Coral Rapids, Ontario
 Extreme western point
 Confluence with the Little Abitibi River
 Joins the Moose River
 Enters James Bay as part of the Moose River

Tributaries
 Little Abitibi River
 Frederick House River
 Black River

Protected areas
A small portion of the river (from the outlet of Lake Abitibi to Couchching Falls) is protected in the Abitibi-De-Troyes Provincial Park. Until April 2005, this park included all the public lands stretching along the Abitibi River to Iroquois Falls, but most of these were deregulated because the significant amount of private land within the area that made the management of the waterway class provincial park difficult.

Power generation

The Abitibi River is used extensively for the hydro-electric power generation. Power stations on the river are in downstream order:

See also
List of Ontario rivers

References

External links

Rivers of Cochrane District